Patricia Quinn may refer to:

Patricia Quinn (American actress) (born 1937)
Patricia Quinn (Northern Irish actress) (born 1944), Northern Irish actress, often referred to as "Pat"
Patricia Quinn (scientist), atmospheric chemist

See also
 Pat Quinn (disambiguation)
 Patrick Quinn (disambiguation)